Michal Pančík aka hermelín  may refer to:

Michal Pančík (footballer born 1971)
Michal Pančík (footballer born 1982)